Gully Mill is a historic grist mill located on the Cape Fear River near Fayetteville, Cumberland County, North Carolina.  The mill was built about 1900, and consists of one and two story sections, a large water wheel operated by water flowing
through a partially underground flume, and an open rear shed.  Also on the property are a miller's house, corrugated metal storage silos, a chicken coop, and miscellaneous related structures.

It was listed on the National Register of Historic Places in 1983.

References

Grinding mills in North Carolina
Grinding mills on the National Register of Historic Places in North Carolina
Industrial buildings completed in 1908
Buildings and structures in Fayetteville, North Carolina
National Register of Historic Places in Cumberland County, North Carolina
1908 establishments in North Carolina